Greeff is a surname. Notable people with the surname include:

Arno Greeff (born 1995), South African actor
Carel Greeff (born 1990), South African rugby union player
Jean Greeff (born 1990), South African weightlifter
Lloyd Greeff (born 1994), South African rugby union player 
Melissa Greeff (born 1994), South African chess player
Pikkie Greeff (1968 - 2021), South African military trade union National Secretary
Richard Greeff (1829-1892), German zoologist
Stephan Greeff (born 1989), South African rugby union player 
Werner Greeff (born 1977), South African rugby union player